"You Wouldn't Know" is the first single from heavy metal supergroup Hellyeah from their debut album Hellyeah. This song is featured in the video games Madden NFL 08 and WWE SmackDown vs. Raw 2008.

Lyrically, the song is about the struggles that Vinnie Paul dealt with after the murder of his brother Dimebag Darrell.  It can be interpreted as a narrative, where Vinnie Paul is the elder, telling a younger person that "You couldn't be me even if you wanted to" because of the heartbreak that he had to overcome.

Chart performance
The song reached number 5 on the Billboard Hot Mainstream Rock Tracks chart and reached number 35 on the Modern Rock Tracks chart.

Music video
The video for the song was released in March 2007.  It features the musical group performing live in front of a large crowd observing them.

Personnel
Hellyeah
Chad Gray – vocals
Greg Tribbett – lead guitar
Tom Maxwell – rhythm guitar
Jerry Montano – bass
Vinnie Paul – drums
Production
Produced, engineered, mixed, and mastered by Vinnie Paul and Sterling Winfield
Co-produced by Hellyeah
Additional guitar tracks recorded by Drew Mazurek

References

2007 songs
2007 debut singles
Hellyeah songs
Epic Records singles
Songs written by Vinnie Paul
Songs written by Chad Gray
Songs written by Greg Tribbett
Songs written by Tom Maxwell
Alternative metal songs